Roberto Cavalli S.p.A. is an Italian luxury fashion company founded by the designer Roberto Cavalli in Osmannoro, Florence, during the 1970s. Known for animal prints on leather and textiles, the label manufactures and markets haute couture, ready-to-wear, and accessories, including handbags, eye wear, watches, shoes, perfumes and jewelry. The company also develops interior design projects for high-end buildings and hotels.

In 2015, the Italian investment fund Clessidra SGR acquired a 90 percent stake in Roberto Cavalli to relaunch the company. Gian Giacomo Ferraris is the CEO of the company and Paul Surridge the creative director.

History

Founding years
Roberto Cavalli studied at the Accademia di Belle Arti di Firenze (Academy of Fine Arts of Florence). His grandfather was a prominent painter of the Macchiaioli group. His fashion career started in the 1960s. Working in his own silk printing shop, he began to apply a new painterly technique to fully fashioned garments, which later resulted in garment dyeing techniques. Throughout the 1970s, he kept on experimenting with other materials, mainly leather.

In 1970, the Italian fashion designer's debut collection in Paris showcased his leather patchwork designs, created with the collaboration of Mario Valentino. In 1972, he showcased his patchwork designs applied to jeans in the first Roberto Cavalli women's runway collection show at Palazzo Pitti in Florence, which was the major prêt-à-porter event at the time in Italy. His work attracted many international fashion labels, including Hermès, Pierre Cardin, Krizia and Emilio Pucci.

Expansion
The 1994 Collection at the Milan Fashion Week put on stage the Cavalli Woman: tiger and wildlife motifs applied to jeans, printed clothing, embroidered fur and long, lavish gowns that showed off the body. Animal prints were a distinctive element of the brand. Later, the sand-blasted denim came out and the fashion house was the first to show Lycra stretch jeans. New clothing lines were launched on the market: Just Cavalli, Angels & Devils (renamed Roberto Cavalli Junior), and Class Cavalli. The first Roberto Cavalli mono-brand boutique opened in Venice in 1996. At the end of 2001, the brand was distributed in more than 30 countries, including the United States, Asian and Russian markets.

The Marcolin group started to develop and distribute Roberto Cavalli and Just Cavalli sunglasses and optical frames. In 2002 the company teamed up with Sector to design 6 Cavalli watch lines, which itself made €3.9 million revenue. The Just Cavalli Club opened in Milan the same year. In 2007, Roberto Cavalli became the first Italian fashion brand to create a limited collection for the fast-fashion retailer H&M.

On the 40th anniversary celebration in 2010, the label presented an exclusive runway collection in Paris, which included most of its iconic dresses. In the last years, under Roberto Cavalli's lead, the new interior design division Roberto Cavalli Home debuted at the Salone del Mobile trade fair in 2012. New licensing agreements were signed with Renzo Rosso's OTB Group for Just Cavalli and Coty Inc. For Roberto Cavalli and Just Cavalli perfumes. The company closed 2014 with €210 million revenue and €12 million loss.

Change of ownership
In 2015 the Italian private equity fund Clessidra SGR acquired a 90% stake in Roberto Cavalli with some other minor partners such as L-GAM, Chow Tai Fook Enterprises, and the Florentine designer himself. Named CEO in July 2016, former Versace head Gian Giacomo Ferraris started a reorganization plan to rationalize the production, logistics and retail cost operations. The company returned to its Tuscan origins: the Milan headquarter was closed and relocated at the Osmannoro plant, where the manufacturing of men's, children's and underwear lines were brought back in-house. The group focused on accessories, women's pret-à-porter and men's collections.

In May 2017, the company appointed Paul Surridge as the new creative director, following the departure of Peter Dundas, who had covered the role since 2015. Surridge presented his Spring/Summer 2018 debut collection for Roberto Cavalli at the Milano Moda Donna fashion show. A recent partnership with the real estate developer DAMAC Properties based in Dubai led to the construction of the new Cavalli Villas in the Middle East.

In 2019, the company was struggling financially. It closed its US stores and engaged the liquidation of its North American operations. On 28 November 2019, Hussain Sajwani, president of DAMAC, purchased the company through the private investment company Vision Investments. The company enhanced its e-commerce primarily as a result of the COVID-19 pandemic, and maintained its physical stores in Europe, Middle East and Asia. In 2020, the company announced it would move its historic headquarters from Sesto Fiorentino to Milan.

Brands/Lines
The galaxy of the Cavalli group lines include:

 Roberto Cavalli: the historic collection of evening gowns. The new era introduced day wear clothing and accessories, including shoes, handbags, leather goods and jewelry.
 Just Cavalli: launched in 1998. Developed and distributed by licensing Renzo Rosso's OTB since 2011. 
 Class Cavalli: outwear for women and men, distributed by licensing company Swinger International since 2015.
 Roberto Cavalli Junior: produced in-house, it's made for boys and girls aged 0–16 years.
 Roberto Cavalli Home: officially launched in 2012 at the Salone del Mobile di Milano trade fair, the interiors collections are developed through the collaboration of Made in Italy's partners. Among these: JC Passion Srl for the furniture line; Industrie Emiliana Parati SpA for wallpapers; Gruppo Ceramiche Ricchetti SpA for tiles; Caleffi SpA for home textile; Arnolfo di Cambio – Compagnia del Cristallo Srl for l’Art de La Table and La Murrina for lamps and accessories crafted with glasses Made in Murano

Real Estate 
Damac’s Hussain Sajwani will launch Cavalli residences at $120 Million plot located at Miami on the site of collapsed Surfside condominium.

Distribution
The first Roberto Cavalli mono-branded boutique opened in Venice in 1996, followed by the Milan-based boutique in via della Spiga in 2000, and new stores opened in Rome and Florence. The group currently operates a network of 49 direct stores and 29 franchisee stores, located in the main capital cities and fashion streets around the globe: Milan, London, Paris, New York, Miami, Moscow, San Paolo, Dubai, Hong Kong among many others.

References

Bibliography
</ref>

Roberto Cavalli on 

High fashion brands
Jewellery companies of Italy
Luxury brands
Perfume houses
Clothing brands of Italy
Haute couture
Fashion accessory brands
Jewellery retailers of Italy
Watch manufacturing companies of Italy
Roberto Cavalli
Roberto Cavalli
Companies that have filed for Chapter 7 bankruptcy
Companies that filed for Chapter 11 bankruptcy in 2019
Roberto Cavalli